A bronze sculpture of McDull, an anthropomorphic pig cartoon character, was installed on Hong Kong's Avenue of Stars, along Tsim Sha Tsui's waterfront in Kowloon, in 2011. The statue has been relocated to the Tsim Sha Tsui East Waterfront Podium Garden temporarily, during an ongoing waterfront revitalisation project.

References

External links

 

2011 establishments in Hong Kong
Animal sculptures in Hong Kong
McDull
McDull
McDull
Pigs in art
McDull
Statues of fictional characters
Tsim Sha Tsui